SuperChannel, Super Channel or Super-channel may refer to: 

Television channels:

 Super Channel (Canada), a Canadian pay channel established in November 2007
 Movie Central, the western Canadian pay channel known as "Superchannel" until 2001; ceased operations in 2016. Related to the above in name only, although both incarnations were established by the same organization
 The Movie Network, a separate Canadian (formerly Eastern Canada only) pay channel known as "First Choice Superchannel" in the mid-1980s; related to the above in name only
 NBC Europe, the defunct European satellite television channel known as "Super Channel" or "NBC Super Channel"
 WACX, a religious TV station in Orlando, Florida that uses the SuperChannel branding
 Super! drama TV, a Japanese TV Channel formerly known as Super Channel (or Super Channel Japan)

Technology:
 Super-channel, a type of combined networking channel in Dense Wavelength Division Multiplexing

See also 
 Superstation